Cladodromia is a genus of flies in the family Empididae.

Species
C. bicolor (Philippi, 1865)
C. boliviana (Bezzi, 1909)
C. cana (Bezzi, 1905)
C. decurtata Collin, 1933
C. flavipes (Philippi, 1865)
C. fuscimana (Bezzi, 1909)
C. futilis Collin, 1928
C. inca (Bezzi, 1905)
C. inconstans Collin, 1933
C. insignita (Collin, 1928)
C. inturbida (Collin, 1928)
C. mediana Collin, 1933
C. minima Collin, 1933
C. negata (Collin, 1928)
C. nigrimana (Philippi, 1865)
C. nitida Collin, 1933
C. plurivittata (Bezzi, 1909)
C. pollinosa Collin, 1938
C. pratincola (Philippi, 1865)
C. semilugens (Philippi, 1865)
C. soleata (Collin, 1928)
C. stigmatica Collin, 1933
C. tanyptera Collin, 1933

References

Empidoidea genera
Empididae